Ksenia Anske (born Ksenia Kubeeva; February 6, 1976) is an American fantasy short fiction writer and novelist. She published seven novels and two books from her tweets about writing.

Personal life 
Ksenia was born in 1976 in Moscow, Russia. Her parents divorced when she was four years old. Her father brought her to Berlin to live with his family when she was eleven, where she lived for four years. When she was fifteen she began writing diaries, then switched to poetry and flash fiction. Ksenia ran away from home when she was seventeen.

In early 1994, she married Yuri Milioutin, and later that year they had a daughter together, Anya Milioutina. They divorced in 1998.

In 1998, Ksenia married Maxim Oustiougov. In November 1998 the family moved to Seattle, Washington, United States without knowing English. In 2003, they had a son together, Peter Ustyugov. Ksenia and Maxim separated, and later divorced in 2011.

She began dating Royce Daniel in November 2010.

Education and career
She studied architecture at Moscow Architectural Institute from 1996-1998. In 2002, she graduated with a Bachelor of Fine Arts in design from Cornish College of the Arts.

She founded Lilipip in 2007, an online animated marketing videos for businesses. In 2009, she was named one of the Top 100 Women in Seattle Tech by Puget Sound Business Journal, named Geek of the Week, and won the UW Business Plan Competition in the “best idea” category for her startup, Lilipip. She also was a social media consultant. In 2012, she quit her career to be a full-time writer.

Anske self-publishes her books, even giving away her e-books for free on her website, including all drafts of the novels.

"Anske" is an anagram of Ksenia, excluding the "i".

In September, 2014, Amtrak announced that she was one of two local winners of the first ever Amtrak Writers Residency.

Literary influences 
Her earliest influences were Tove Jannson, Astrid Lindgren, and many Russian fairy tales.

Authors that later influenced her work include Anton Chekhov, Vladimir Nabokov, Mikhaíl Bulgakov, Alexander Pushkin, and Daniil Kharms. Her influences after learning English include Stephen King, J.K. Rowling, Chuck Palahniuk, Cormac McCarthy, Haruki Murakami, Neil Gaiman, and Virginia Woolf.

Social outreach 
Anske posts bi-weekly on her own blog, sharing posts from personal essays to professional writing tips. Through her books and blog, she advocates bringing awareness to suicide and sexual abuse.

Bibliography

Siren Suicides Trilogy 

 I Chose to Die (2013)
 My Sisters in Death (2013)
 The Afterlife (2013)

Novels 
 Rosehead (2014)
 Irkadura (2014)
 The Badlings (2015)
 Siren Suicides: Second Edition (2016)
 TUBE: Trans-Urban Blitz-Express (2018)
 The Dacha Murders (forthcoming)

Short stories 
 Rain of Elephants Reported (Our Brothers Grimmest by The Grimm Report, 2013)
 Ilka (Paper and Ink Literary Zine, Issue 6, 2015)
 A Collection of Short Stories (Forthcoming)

Nonfiction 
 Blue Sparrow: tweets on writing, reading, and other creative nonsense (2013)
 Blue Sparrow 2: tweets on writing, reading, and other creative nonsense (2015)

References 

1976 births
Living people
Writers from Moscow
American fantasy writers
Women science fiction and fantasy writers